Cytaea ponapensis is a species of jumping spider.

Name
The species is named after the island of Ponape in the Caroline Island, where the first specimens were collected.

Distribution
Cytaea ponapensis is only known from Ponape in the Caroline Islands.

References
  (2007): The world spider catalog, version 8.0. American Museum of Natural History.

External links
  (1998): Salticidae of the Pacific Islands. III.  Distribution of Seven Genera, with Description of Nineteen New Species and Two New Genera. Journal of Arachnology 26(2): 149-189. PDF

Fauna of the Federated States of Micronesia
ponapensis
Spiders of Oceania
Spiders described in 1998